Andrea van den Hurk (born 2 February 1979) is a former tennis player from the Netherlands.

A right-handed player from Haarlem, van den Hurk competed on the professional tour from 1996 to 2004.

She was most successful as a doubles player, with 13 ITF titles and a best ranking of 146 in the world, which she reached in 2000. On the WTA Tour, she featured in the main draw of five doubles tournaments, three of which came in 2000 partnering Debby Haak.

ITF finals

Singles (0–2)

Doubles (13–10)

External links
 
 

1979 births
Living people
Dutch female tennis players
Sportspeople from Haarlem
20th-century Dutch women
21st-century Dutch women